Dan Filip Stulbach (born September 26, 1969) is a Brazilian actor, television presenter, director and artistic director.

Biography 
He is the first member of a small family of Polish Jewish immigrants to be born in Brazil. He has only one sister, who is a nutritionist and mother of his only nephew. At home, he grew up listening to the Polish language and stories his grandfather told him about life in Poland, devastated during World War II.

After graduating from the Colégio Rio Branco, he was undecided about the profession he was supposed to follow, he had a college entrance exam - and was approved - in Medicine, Administration and Engineering. He studied for a year at the Faculty of Engineering, but graduated in Social Communication, at the School of Advertising and Marketing (ESPM). He also attended the School of Dramatic Art at USP. At ESPM, he created the theater group Tangerina, which still exists today. For eight years he directed group shows, which won several amateur theater festivals.

He lived in San Diego, California for almost a year. There he studied English and worked as a movie ticket holder. With the money he earned, he spent a season in New York City, where he could watch dozens of plays.

Stulbach is often touted as being similar to American actor Tom Hanks, having even been satirized as such by the group of comedians Casseta & Planeta.

Career

References

External links 

 

1969 births
Living people
Male actors from São Paulo
Brazilian people of Polish-Jewish descent
Brazilian male television actors
Brazilian male telenovela actors
Brazilian male film actors
Brazilian male stage actors
Brazilian Jews
21st-century Brazilian male actors